South Windsor is a suburb of the town of Windsor, in the state of New South Wales, Australia. It is generally bounded in the west by Rickabys Creek and in the east by South Creek, both tributaries of the Hawkesbury River. It is also home of Bede Polding College, a Catholic secondary school.

South Windsor was previously

The population is somewhat younger than the bulk of the country. Children aged under 15 years made up 22.7% of the population, and people aged 65 years and over made up 10.2% of the population.

The majority of residents (82.6%) were born in Australia, compared to the national average of 69.8%; the next most common countries of birth were England 4.3%, New Zealand 2.1%, Scotland 0.8%, Philippines 0.7% and Malta 0.4%.

References

Suburbs of Sydney
City of Hawkesbury
Hawkesbury River